Aich is a municipality in the district of Liezen in Styria, Austria.

References

Schladming Tauern
Cities and towns in Liezen District